Namma Madurai Sisters is a 2022 Indian-Tamil language drama television series starring Sruthi Lakshmi, Sunitha, Sankavi and Iraa Agarwal. It premiered on Colors Tamil 21 February 2022 and ended on 23 September 2022.

Synopsis
The series follows with four sisters: Indhrani, Meghala, Bhuvana and Kavya, who create the perfect recipe for success after years of hard work at their department store.

Cast

Main
 Chaya Singh / Sruthi Lakshmi as Indhrani
 Sunitha as Meghala
 Sankavi as Bhuvana Shivakumar
 Iraa Agarwal as Kavya Nandakumar

Supporting
 Deepak Kumar as Nandakumar (Nanda)
 Harishankar Narayanan / Venkatesh as Shivakumar
 Parthan as Rajamanickam
 Rathan Ganapathy as Muthumanickam
 Aswanth Thilak as Ashwin

Production

Casting
Chaya Singh was selected to play Indhrani, but was replaced by Sruthi Lakshmi in May 2022. Iraa Agarwal joined the cast in November 2021. Sunitha was selected to play Meghala and Sankavi as Bhuvana in December 2021. Deepak Kumar was cast, and he had to leave the series Endrendrum Punnagai.

Release
The first promo was released on 8 January 2021, and the second on 24 January 2021.

Post-production
Colors Tamil deployed a campaign in print, digital and outdoor media over 30 sites across Central and South Tamil Nadu.

Original soundtrack

Title song
"Thunindhu Vaa Nee" was sung by Vaikom Vijayalakshmi.

Soundtrack

References

External links

2022 Tamil-language television series debuts
2022 Tamil-language television series endings
Colors Tamil original programming
Tamil-language television shows
Television shows set in Tamil Nadu